Pang Chun-Dok is a former international table tennis player from North Korea.

Table tennis career
She won a silver medal for North Korea at the 1985 World Table Tennis Championships in the Corbillon Cup (women's team event) with Cho Jung-hui, Li Bun-Hui and Han Hye-Song.

She also reached the quarter finals of the women's singles and doubles during the 1985 World Championships.

See also
 List of World Table Tennis Championships medalists

References

North Korean female table tennis players
World Table Tennis Championships medalists